The St. Cloud Dam is a dam across the Mississippi River in the town of St. Cloud, Minnesota, in the United States. The dam also has two 4.5 MW turbines which generate electricity that is fed into the Xcel Energy power grid.

The original dam at this location dated from 1887, and ownership was transferred from Northern States Power to the city of St. Cloud in 1967.  During reconstruction of the dam in 1970, a cofferdam was built upstream from the construction site to hold back Mississippi River waters. Due to a structural inadequacy, the cofferdam washed out on October 31, 1970. The energy of the impounded water caused extensive damage to the construction site and downstream areas.

The current dam was retrofitted to produce hydroelectric power, and is used by various hydrology classes at the adjacent St. Cloud State University to demonstrate hydrodynamic properties and to show how power is converted into electricity.  It produces 8.5 megawatts and is the largest city-owned hydroelectric facility in the state.

The dam is located just south of University Drive SE, both connecting the Stearns County section of St. Cloud to the Sherburne County section.

References

External links
Map: 

Dams in Minnesota
Dams on the Mississippi River
Buildings and structures in Sherburne County, Minnesota
Buildings and structures in St. Cloud, Minnesota
United States local public utility dams
Dams completed in 1887
Dams completed in 1970